Newstead Abbey, in Nottinghamshire, England, was formerly an Augustinian priory. Converted to a domestic home following the Dissolution of the Monasteries, it is now best known as the ancestral home of Lord Byron.

Monastic foundation
The priory of St. Mary of Newstead, a house of Augustinian Canons, was founded by King Henry II of England about the year 1170, as one of many penances he paid following the murder of Thomas Becket. Contrary to its current name, Newstead was never an abbey: it was a priory.

In the late 13th century, the priory was rebuilt and extended. It was extended again in the 15th century, when the Dorter, Great Hall and Prior's Lodgings were added. The priory was designed to be home to at least 13 monks, although there appear to have been only 12 (including the Prior) at the time of the dissolution.

The Valor Ecclesiasticus of 1534 gave the clear annual value of this priory as £167 16s. 11½d. The considerable deductions included 20s. given to the poor on Maundy Thursday in commemoration of Henry II, the founder, and a portion of food and drink similar to that of a canon given to some poor person every day, valued at 60s. a year.

Despite the annual value of Newstead being clearly below the £200 assigned as the limit for the suppression of the lesser monasteries, this priory obtained the doubtful privilege of exemption, on payment to the Crown of the heavy fine of £233 6s. 8d in 1537.

The surrender of the house was accomplished on 21 July 1539. The signatures attached were those of John Blake, prior, Richard Kychun, sub-prior, John Bredon, cellarer, and nine other canons, Robert Sisson, John Derfelde, William Dotton, William Bathley, Christopher Motheram, Geoffrey Acryth, Richard Hardwyke, Henry Tingker, and Leonard Alynson.

The prior obtained a pension of £26 13s. 4d., the sub-prior £6, and the rest of the ten canons who signed the surrender sums varying from £5 6s. 8d. to £3 6s. 8d.

The lake was dredged in the late eighteenth century and the lectern, thrown into the Abbey fishpond by the monks to save it during the Dissolution of the Monasteries, was discovered. In 1805 it was given by Archdeacon Kaye to Southwell Minster where it still resides.

Priors of Newstead

 Eustace, 1216
 Richard, 1216
 Robert, 1234
 William (late cellarer), 1241
 William, 1267
 John de Lexinton, resigned 1288
 Richard de Hallam, 1288
 Richard de Grange, 1293
 William de Thurgarton, 1324
 Hugh de Colingham, 1349
 William de Colingham, resigned 1356
 John de Wylesthorp, resigned 1366
 William de Allerton, 1366
 John de Hucknall, 1406
 William Bakewell, 1417
 Thomas Carleton, resigned 1424
 Robert Cutwolfe, resigned 1424
 William Misterton, 1455
 John Durham, 1461
 Thomas Gunthorp, 1467
 William Sandale, 1504
 John Blake, 1526

Country house 

Sir John Byron of Colwick in Nottinghamshire was granted Newstead Abbey by Henry VIII of England on 26 May 1540 and started its conversion into a country house. He was succeeded by his son Sir John Byron  of Clayton Hall. Many additions were made to the original building. The 13th century ecclesiastical buildings were largely ruined during the dissolution of the monasteries. It then passed to John Byron, an MP and Royalist commander, who was created a baron in 1643. He died childless in France and ownership transferred to his brother Richard Byron. Richard's son William was a minor poet and was succeeded in 1695 by his son William Byron, 4th Baron Byron. Early in the 18th century, the 4th Lord Byron landscaped the gardens extensively, and amassed a hugely admired collection of artistic masterpieces.

During the ownership of William, 5th Baron Byron, the Abbey suffered a downturn in fortunes. As a young man, William lavished money on the estate, building picturesque Gothic follies and staging glamorous mock navy battles on the lake. Continuing to take out loans and pursue his pleasures of horse-racing, gambling, and going to the theatre, he found himself financially reliant on a scheme of marrying off his only surviving son and heir to a wealthy heiress. The plan fell apart when his heir eloped with his cousin Juliana Byron, daughter of William's brother John Byron.

Though late 18th-century gossip attested that he ruined the estate, felled trees, and killed deer while hellbent on revenge, this is not the case – he simply had no money to pay his debts, and stripped the Abbey and estate of its artistic treasures, furniture, and even its trees, to quickly raise cash. Though he made thousands of pounds it was not enough to pay back the loans he had been taking out since his thirties, and there was no hope of restoring the Abbey to its former glory.

As well as outliving all four of his children William also outlived his only grandson, who was killed by cannon fire in 1794 while fighting in Corsica at the age of 22. The 5th Lord died on 21 May 1798, at the age of 75. Later, 19th-century myths attest that on his death, the great numbers of crickets he kept at Newstead left the estate in swarms. The title and Newstead Abbey were then left to his great-nephew, George Gordon Byron, then aged 10, who became the 6th Baron Byron and later the famous and notorious poet.

Lord Byron
The young Lord Byron soon arrived at Newstead and was greatly impressed by the estate. The scale of the estate contributed to Byron's extravagant taste and sense of his own importance. However, yearly income had fallen to just £800 and many repairs were needed. He and his mother soon moved to the nearby town of Southwell and neither lived permanently at Newstead for any extended period. His view of the decayed Newstead became one of the romantic ruin, a metaphor for his family's fall:

 Thro' thy battlements, Newstead, the hollow winds whistle;
Thou, the hall of my fathers, art gone to decay.

The estate was leased to the 23-year-old Henry Edward Yelverton, 19th Baron Grey de Ruthyn, from January 1803. The lease was for £50 a year for the Abbey and Park for five years, until Byron came of age. Byron stayed for some time in 1803 with Lord Grey, before they fell out badly.

In 1808, Lord Grey left at the end of his lease and Byron returned to live at Newstead and began extensive and expensive renovations. His works were mainly decorative, however, rather than structural, so that rain and damp obscured his changes within just a few years.

Byron had a beloved Newfoundland dog named Boatswain, who died of rabies in 1808. Boatswain was buried at Newstead Abbey and has a monument larger than his master's. The inscription, from Byron's poem Epitaph to a Dog, has become one of his best-known works:

Byron had wanted to be buried with Boatswain, although he would ultimately be buried in the family vault at the nearby Church of St Mary Magdalene, Hucknall.

He was determined to stay at Newstead—"Newstead and I stand or fall together"—and he hoped to raise a mortgage on the property, but his advisor John Hanson urged a sale. This would be a preoccupation for many years and was certainly not resolved when Byron left for his Mediterranean travels in 1809. Upon his return to England in 1811, Byron stayed in London, not returning to see his mother who had been living in Newstead. She died, leaving him distraught at his own negligence of her. He lived again at the Abbey for a time but was soon drawn to life in London.

For the next few years, Byron made several attempts to sell the Abbey. It was put up at auction in 1812 but failed to reach a satisfactory price. A buyer was found, however, who offered £140,000, which was accepted. By spring 1813, though, the buyer, Thomas Claughton, had only paid £5,000 of the agreed down-payment. Byron was in debt and had continued to spend money on the expectation that the house would be sold. Negotiations began to degenerate and Byron accused Claughton of robbing the wine cellar. By August 1814, it was clear that the sale had fallen through, and Claughton forfeited what he had paid of the deposit. Byron was now without settled financial means and proposed marriage to the heiress Anne Isabella Milbanke. Claughton did return with new proposals involving a reduced price and further delays. Byron turned him down.

Letitia Elizabeth Landon's poetical illustration Lines Suggested on Visiting Newstead Abbey accompanies an engraving of Newstead Abbey after a painting by Thomas Allom (Fisher's Drawing Room Scrap Book, 1839). This poem is mainly a reflection on Byron and what it means to be a poet. Miss Landon may have visited Newstead Abbey on one of her visits to her uncle in Aberford, Yorkshire.

Later owners

Colonel Thomas Wildman

In July 1815, Newstead was once again put up for auction but failed to reach its reserve, bought in at 95,000 guineas. It was only during Byron's exile in Italy, in 1818, that a buyer was found. Thomas Wildman, who had been at Harrow School with Byron and was heir to Jamaican plantations, paid £94,500, easing Byron's financial troubles considerably.

Wildman too spent a great deal of money on the Abbey and its contents, restoring it to some greatness. The architect John Shaw Sr. designed new parts of the abbey for Wildman.

William Frederick Webb
 In 1861, William Frederick Webb, African explorer, bought the Abbey from Wildman's widow. People including David Livingstone, Abdullah Susi, James Chuma and Jacob Wainwright all visited the Abbey at different times during the period Webb lived there. Under Webb, the chapel was redecorated, but the rest of the house remained largely unaltered. After his death in 1899, the estate passed to each of his surviving children and finally to his grandson Charles Ian Fraser. Fraser sold Newstead to local philanthropist Sir Julien Cahn, who presented it to Nottingham Corporation in 1931.

Today
The Abbey is owned by Nottingham City Council and houses a museum containing Byron memorabilia. It plays host to weddings and other events.

References

Further reading
Newstead Priory cartulary 1344, and other archives; translated by Violet W. Walker ; edited by Duncan Gray. Thoroton Society, 1940
Emily Brand, The Fall of the House of Byron (John Murray, 2020)

External links

Newstead Abbey Homepage
Abbotsford and Newstead Abbey by Washington Irving, from Project Gutenberg

1170s establishments in England
1539 disestablishments in England
Grade I listed buildings in Nottinghamshire
Country houses in Nottinghamshire
Monasteries in Nottinghamshire
Augustinian monasteries in England
Lord Byron
Historic house museums in Nottinghamshire
Biographical museums in Nottinghamshire
Gardens in Nottinghamshire
Literary museums in England
Grade I listed museum buildings
Grade I listed houses
Christian monasteries established in the 12th century
Monasteries dissolved under the English Reformation